Armen Gevorgyan (born 8 July 1973) is a former Deputy Prime Minister of Armenia.

References

External links
 Armen Gevorgyan - Armenia Alliance

1973 births
Living people
Government ministers of Armenia
Deputy Prime Ministers of Armenia
Herzen University alumni